The Mandaue City College under Paulus Cañete (self-proclaimed Mandaue City College - Main Campus), colloquially known as MCC Basak or Old MCC, is an unrecognized and unaccredited private higher education institution owned by Paulus Cañete located at Basak, Mandaue City. It's a non-government school and is not connected to the city-owned Mandaue City College located at Mandaue City Cultural and Sports Complex. 

Despite a number of controversies surrounding its legitimacy and regulation, as well as the denial of recognition from the Commission on Higher Education, MCC under Paulus Cañete still continues to operate.

Disputes and controversies
Mandaue City College located in Barangay Basak is the Old MCC originally established in Barangay Tipolo duly created through an Ordinance No. 10-2005-324A co-authored by then Councilor Jonas C. Cortes and amended by Ordinance No. 10-2005-419. It started its operation on Academic Year 2006-2007 which offers undergraduate programs and advance studies or graduate programs. Its president is Dr. Paulus Mariae L. Cañete.

However, on four orders by the Commission on Higher Education (CHED), then Mandaue City Mayor Jonas Cortes said the legitimate city college is the new Mandaue City College (MCC) established in 2007 through Dr. Susana Cabahug at the Mandaue City Cultural Sports Complex and not the old one in Tipolo, which is still operated by Dr. Cañete. The orders, all dated Sept. 14, 2010, specified the city college’s location and that CHED no longer recognizes the old city college. Cañete, on the other hand, said the City Government should have file a petition in court nullifying City Ordinance 419 if it is to remove the legitimacy of the Old MCC. He further claimed that the ordinance, passed in 2007, is the legal basis for the Old MCC’s operations. 

In May 2008, police arrested the Old MCC president Dr. Cañete and five companions in front of the church steps in Barangay Basak, Mandaue. Cañete was charged with illegal possession of a .38-caliber revolver as he allegedly was about to hand over the firearm to a man the school official hired to steal documents from (new) Mandaue City College (MCC). Cañete denied the allegations and was released the following day after posting P60,000 bail before the Municipal Trial Court in Cities.

In July 2011, CHED made a notice to the public regarding their denial of regulation with regard to the operations and legitimacy of the Old MCC thus allowing the Professional Regulation Commission (PRC) and Department of Education (DepEd) to deny recognition of the said institution as well. The notice reiterated the Cañete faction’s defiance of CHED’s closure order dated Dec. 3, 2010. On June 1 2012, Cañete’s MCC faction filed a case before the Regional Trial Court in Quezon City, seeking to nullify the closure order and the notice to the public earlier issued by CHED against them. However still in 2012, the Court issues TRO against CHED. As per the issued writ, MCC graduates shall be recognized by CHED to be followed by PRC and DepEd while the main case is being heard.

In 2013, the Old MCC under Cañete relocated to its new building inaugurated in its present location in Barangay Basak, Mandaue City.

External links
Official Facebook page

References

Universities and colleges in Metro Cebu
Education in Mandaue